Acacia gilbertii is a shrub of the genus Acacia and the subgenus Pulchellae that is endemic to an area of south western Australia.

Description
It blooms from October to February and produces white flowers.

Taxonomy
The species was first formally described by the botanist Carl Meisner in 1848 as a part of the Johann Georg Christian Lehmann work Plantae Preissianae. It was reclassified as Racosperma gilbertii in 2003 by Leslie Pedley and was then transferred back to genus Acacia in 2006.

Distribution
It is native to an area in the Wheatbelt and South West regions of Western Australia where it is found growing in gravelly lateritic soils. The shrub has a scattered distribution from around York in the north down to around Augusta in the south and out to near Denmark in the south east as a part of Eucalyptus woodland or Eucalyptus marginata forest communities.

See also
 List of Acacia species

References

gilbertii
Acacias of Western Australia
Taxa named by Carl Meissner
Plants described in 1848